Fariba Hachtroudi (born 1951 in Teheran) is a French-Iranian journalist and writer.

Early life
Fariba Hachtroudi is the daughter of Mohsen Hashtroodi, a prominent Iranian mathematician, and Robab Hashtroodi, a professor of humanities and Persian literature. Sheikh Ismail Hashtroodi was her grandfather.

In 1963, Hachtroudi moved to France. She trained as an archaeologist, receiving her doctoral degree in 1978.

Career
Early in her journalistic career, Hachtroudi covered the Iran–Iraq War.

Following the Iranian Revolution, Hachtroudi began writing polemics against Khomeini and the religious authorities in Iran. Between 1981–83, she lived in Sri Lanka, teaching at Colombo University.

In 1985, she entered Iran secretly via Baluchistan and travelled around the country, investigating the consequences of the Revolution and the Iran–Iraq War on life in the country. Her first book, L’exilée, describes her experiences.

From 1995, Hachtroudi has led the humanitarian and cultural organisation Mohsen Hachtroudi (MoHa), an initiative of which is the Gitanjali Literary Prize.

Hachtroudi's first novel, Iran, les rives du sang, was awarded the French Republic's Human Rights Prize in 2001.

Selected works

Non-fiction

Novels

Poetry

In English translation

References

External links 
 Fariba Hachtroudi's home page

French journalists
Iranian journalists
1951 births
People from Tehran
French people of Azerbaijani descent
Living people
French women novelists
French women journalists
Iranian women journalists
Iranian women novelists
Iranian novelists
Iranian non-fiction writers
Iranian emigrants to France